Phenolates (also called phenoxides) are anions, salts, and esters of phenols. They may be formed by reaction of phenols with strong base.

Properties 

Alkali metal phenolates, such as sodium phenolate hydrolyze in aqueous solution to form basic solutions. At pH = 10, phenol and phenolate are in approximately 1:1 proportions.

Phenolate anions are enolates. As such, they react as nucleophiles at both oxygen and carbon positions. In general, reaction at oxygen occurs under kinetic control, whereas reaction at carbon occurs under thermodynamic control.

Uses 
Alkyl aryl ethers can be synthesized through the Williamson ether synthesis by treating sodium phenolate with an alkyl halide:
C6H5ONa + CH3I → C6H5OCH3 + NaI
C6H5ONa + (CH3O)2SO2 → C6H5OCH3 + (CH3O)SO3Na

Production of salicylic acid 
Salicylic acid is produced in the Kolbe–Schmitt reaction between carbon dioxide and sodium phenolate.

See also 
 Sodium phenolate

References